Eroica Peninsula is an ice-covered peninsula lying north of Beethoven Peninsula and Mendelssohn Inlet in western Alexander Island, Antarctica. The tip of the peninsula is Kosar Point, marking the western extremity of the Eroica Peninsula. It was mapped from trimetrogon air photography taken by the Ronne Antarctic Research Expedition, 1947–48, and from survey by the Falkland Islands Dependencies Survey, 1948–50. It was named by the UK Antarctic Place-Names Committee after Beethoven's Eroica symphony, in association with Beethoven Peninsula. Eroica Peninsula is one of the eight peninsulas of Alexander Island.

See also

 Derocher Peninsula
 Harris Peninsula
 Shostakovich Peninsula

Further reading 
 Cook, Alison & Vaughan, David. (2009), Overview of areal changes of the ice shelves on the Antarctic Peninsula over the past 50 years, The Cryosphere Discussions. 4. 10.5194/tcd-3-579-2009

References 

Peninsulas of Alexander Island
Ludwig van Beethoven